Inex-Adria Aviopromet Flight 1308 was a McDonnell Douglas MD-81 aircraft operating a Yugoslavian charter flight to the French island of Corsica.  On 1 December, 1981, the flight crashed on Corsica's Mont San-Pietro, killing all 180 people on board.  The crash was the deadliest and first major aviation accident involving a McDonnell Douglas MD-80.

Background 
On October 22, 1981, Inex-Adria sent a request to authorize the charter flight, which received the number JP-1308, from Ljubljana to Ajaccio and back, on 1 December of the same year. The flight was chartered by the Slovenian travel agency Kompas, based in Ljubljana. The application terms stated that flight 1308 would use a McDonnell Douglas DC-9 aircraft with a seating capacity of 115 to 135. The permit was issued by the General Directorate of Civil Aviation on 16 November. However, the airline decided to not use the DC-9 and instead decided to use the McDonnell Douglas MD-81 as it was a newer and larger aircraft. The application originally indicated the flight would carry 130 passengers, however, there were an additional 43 passengers on board who were Inex-Adria employees, Kompas tourists, and/or their families which totaled up to 173 passengers. As the crew consisted of seven people, there was a total of 180 people on board.

Aircraft and crew 
The aircraft was a McDonnell Douglas MD-81 registered in Yugoslavia as YU-ANA (manufacturers serial number 48047). The aircraft's first flight was 15 May 1981. The aircraft was delivered to Inex-Adria on 11 August. The aircraft only had 683 flying hours at the time of the accident. The last A-check on the aircraft was performed on 7 November 1981. The last maintenance test of the aircraft took place four days before the accident, on 27 November. The aircraft was powered by two Pratt & Whitney JT8D-217 turbofan engines (numbers P708403D and P708404D), each developing 20,850 pounds of thrust and having a total operating time of 683 hours, recorded since check A-47.

The captain was 55-year-old Ivan Kunović. He received his pilot license for jet aircraft on 16 April 1968 at the Yugoslav Academy of the Air Force in Zadar and was qualified to fly the F-84, T-33 and F-86. Kunović was a JRV in the rank of Capitan soon after which he was hired by Inex-Adria in 1970 and became a first officer on the DC-9 the same year. He then became a captain of the DC-9 (32 and 50 series) on 4 April 1972 and then an MD-80 captain on 13 August 1981 after 3 months of training in the United States. At the time of the accident, Kunović had a total of 12,123 flight hours, including 5,675 hours on the DC-9 and 188 hours on the MD-81.

The co-pilot was 40-year-old M. Franc Terglav. He was initially qualified to pilot flights in the JRV school for the reserve pilots (ŠRVO 14 kl.in 1962) He was flying on the Aero 3, Soko 522 and later the civilian Piper PA-31, PA-34 and Cessna Citation. He was a pilot for the Slovenian company Gorenje. Soon after he became a pilot for Inex-Adria and started flying the DC-9 (32 and 50 series) On 21 June 1981, he graduated to first officer on the MD-81 and he received his commercial pilots license on 11 November 1981.  Terglav had a total of 4,213 flight hours, with 746 of them on the DC-9 (which were accumulated during 529 flights), and 288 hours on the MD-81.

Accident 
Flight JP 1308 took off from Ljubljana Airport (then Brnik Airport) at 06:41, on a chartered flight from Slovenia (at the time Yugoslavia) to Corsica's capital city of Ajaccio with 173 Slovenian passengers and 7 crew members. At 07:08, the aircraft was in Italian airspace when the controller in Padua contacted a colleague in Ajaccio and requested the actual weather report. The southwest (240°) moderate wind was blowing at the airport at that time , and the sky was covered with separate clouds. When the pilots received weather reports, they decided to land on runway 03, while the captain clarified that if the wind increased, they would fly around for inspection. At 07:28 the plane entered the zone of the control center in Rome and the flight was cleared to descend to flight level FL 270 (. The crew asked whether or not they were cleared to descend. The controller told the crew that they were not cleared, and the crew acknowledged the transmission, thanking the controller.

At 07:31, the controller again cleared flight 1308 to descend to FL270, which the crew acknowledged, reporting that they were leaving FL330 and beginning to descend. The controller also clarified that the flight would be cleared to descend to FL190 after passing Elbe. The Cockpit Voice Recorder (CVR) recorded a sound similar to the activation of the "Fasten seat belt" sign and captain Kunovic instructed first officer Terglav to calculate the landing parameters. A flight attendant entered the cockpit and asked to reduce the temperature in the cabin, which the first officer did. At 07:33, the controller cleared Flight 1308 to descend to FL 190 at Bastia. At some point, first officer Terglav let his young son enter the cockpit, as a child's voice was heard asking when the aircraft would descend. 

At 07:35, the crew entered the air traffic control space in Marseille and subsequently established radio contact at 07:35:50, reporting the passage of flight level (FL) 210 and descending to 190 in the direction of Ajaccio, after which he requested permission for a further reduction. In response, the controller instructed them to maintain FL 190 to Bastia and to "squawk" 5200 on its transponder, since the direct route to Ajaccio went close to the closed LFR 65 airspace, and this manoeuvre would bypass it. At 07:40:35, the crew reported on staying at FL 190  from Ajaccio and again requested permission to descend, to which the controller cleared them to descend to FL 110. Giving permission to descend, the controller used non-standard terminology, "cleared down 110", to which the crew later discussed in the cockpit. Then the crew reviewed the approach procedure for the Instrument Landing System (ILS) on runway 03. Further, at 07:47:10, the captain contacted the Ajaccio approach controller for the first time, reporting "Bonjour Ajaccio, Adria JP 1308, we're level 110, approaching Ajaccio VOR and further descent."

At 07:49:31 JP 1308 informed the Ajaccio approach controller, "Just now Ajaccio VOR, level is 110 in holding pattern." At 07:49:36 the Ajaccio approach controller responded, "Report leaving Alpha Juliet Oscar on radial 247 for final approach". Capt. Kunovic responded at 07:49:44 – "Okay sir, we're just over Ajaccio VOR and we're requesting further descent." This began the chain of misunderstandings between the Ajaccio approach controller and the JP 1308's crew, as the Ajaccio approach controller appeared to believe that JP 1308 would skip the holding pattern and proceed to a direct approach on radial 247 from AJO VOR, as done by many pilots making the same approach. Capt. Kunovic, on the other hand, who had never flown to Ajaccio before, entered a holding pattern over AJO VOR.

Believing that JP 1308 was flying on radial 247 outbound from AJO VOR, the approach controller approved descent at 07:49:52 – "1308, you are cleared to descent 3000, QNH 1009, on the radial 247 Alpha Juliet Oscar, report leaving Ajaccio." Here the approach controller unnecessarily complicated his instruction by adding QNH 1009 (a redundant piece of information he had already provided to JP 1308), but this was not critical, only somewhat increasing the mental load of the crew. JP 1308's crew failed to understand two crucial pieces of information: that the approach controller cleared them to descend on AJO VOR radial 247, not in the holding pattern, and that their holding pattern's MHA was 6,800 ft. (see Fig. 2)

At 07:50:05 Capt. Kunovic responded, "Roger, will do, and we're leaving 11 for 3000, radial 247 out of one one zero QNH, repeat again, one zero zero nine." Using the vague term radial 247 reinforced the approach controller's belief that JP 1308 was skipping the AJO VOR holding pattern and continuing to a direct approach. In addition, it can be observed here that repeated info on QNH by the approach controller was completely unnecessary and increased the crew's mental load, as Capt. Kunovic first made a read back mistake and then corrected it by repeating the right QNH. This was a relatively minor miscommunication, but still contributed to the confusion on the flight deck and at ATC.   

At 07:50:19 Capt. Kunovic informs the approach controller – "We're in holding over Ajaccio, call you inbound on radial 247."  At this time, the approach controller failed to notice that JP 1308 was in its holding pattern over AJO VOR, not on radial 247 outbound from AJO VOR as he believed, and responds at 07:50:28 with a plain "roger."  This is the third main understanding, and at this point, the ensuing disaster still could have been avoided if ATC were to notice the discrepancy between the flight's pattern and its directions. Neither the approach controller nor the JP 1308's crew understood the situation in time.

At 07:52:15 Capt. Kunovic radioed, "We're rolling inbound, out of 6000." and the approach controller responded with, "Roger 1308, report turning inbound." Kunovic meant that the plane was turning left in the holding pattern towards AJO VOR, but the approach controller thought he meant that the JP 1308 was turning inbound over the sea towards Ajaccio Airport. 

The last transmission from JP 1308 was received at 07:52:25 when Capt. Kunovic reported, "Turning inbound to Ajaccio because at the moment we're in cloud."

At 07:52:30 the approach controller, still believing that JP 1308 was turning inbound to Ajaccio Airport and entering its final approach, responded "Roger 1308, report Charlie Tango on final, surface wind 280°/20kts." This was the final point at which JP 1308's crew still had a chance to avert the impending disaster. The CVR recorded surprise at the mention of CT NDB by ATC, causing crew confusion; at 07:53:08, the CVR recorded the GPWS sounding – "TERRAIN, TERRAIN, TERRAIN, PULL-UP, PULL-UP, …"

Surprised by the alert, JP 1308's crew failed to execute evasive manoeuvres for the next 9 seconds. At 07:53:17, Capt. Kunovic ordered, "POWER!" With  of the left wing sheared off, the aircraft rolled upside down, entered into an uncontrolled dive and violently crashed into the gorge on the other side of the mountain eight seconds later, killing everyone on board. The time of the accident was 7:53 a.m. local time (07:53 UTC).

At 07:53:21 a four-second transmission from JP 1308, containing only a whistling sound, sounded in the Ajaccio approach control room. The approach controller tried to contact the crew, with no response, three consecutive times afterwards. The controller then notified emergency services.

Search 

At 9 am, seven minutes after losing contact with flight 1308, an emergency search began. The controller mistakenly believed that flight 1308 crashed at sea. Finally, at 12:40, a wing fragment was found on the top of Mount San Pietro,  from the coast. The next day the rescuers reached the crash site, only to find that there were no survivors.

Investigation 

The crew, apparently surprised at the instruction to descend, repeated several times that they were still in the holding pattern, which the control acknowledged. The crew was unfamiliar with the airport and its vicinity, as this was the first flight of Inex-Adria Aviopromet to Corsica. The investigation determined that the imprecise language used by the crew of the MD-81 and the air traffic controller played a significant role in the accident. Air traffic control in Ajaccio was cleared of all charges. The air traffic controller in charge of Flight 1308 was transferred to another airport in France.

At the time of the accident, the Ajaccio airport had no radar system. As a direct result of the accident, the equipment was upgraded and the approach pattern changed.

2008 clean-up operation 
Some debris and human bodies were removed from the crash site after the accident in 1981. In 2007, POP TV (a TV station in Slovenia) did a news report on the accident. They visited the crash site in Corsica and found many of the airplane's parts still scattered on Mont San-Pietro, in rugged and inaccessible terrain. Subsequently, the Government of Slovenia, Adria Airways and Kompas (the Slovenian travel agency that organized the fatal trip in 1981) organized and funded a clean-up operation. A Slovenian team of about 60 soldiers, mountain rescuers, civil protection and rescue service members, medical personnel, and other volunteers removed about 27 tons of aircraft remains in May 2008. The removed debris included one aircraft engine and large wing parts. Some of the parts were so large they needed to be machine cut before transporting them from the mountain by a helicopter. Several human remains were also found, and were either sent for further identification tests, or were properly disposed. A commemorative plaque was installed at the site of the initial wing impact.

References

External links 

Final report  (Archive) – French Secretariat of State for Transport

Aviation Safety Network – Picture of the MD-81 that would become Flight 1308
24ur.Com – Videos of the crash of Flight 1308

Aviation accidents and incidents in 1981
Accidents and incidents involving the McDonnell Douglas MD-81
Airliner accidents and incidents involving controlled flight into terrain
Aviation accidents and incidents caused by air traffic controller error
Airliner accidents and incidents caused by pilot error
Aviation accidents and incidents in France
Contemporary history of Slovenia
1981 in France
1308
1981 in Yugoslavia
December 1981 events in Europe